The 1966–67 Regionalliga  was the fourth season of the Regionalliga, the second tier of the German football league system. The league operated in five regional divisions, Berlin, North, South, Southwest and West. The five league champions and all five runners-up, at the end of the season, entered a promotion play-off to determine the two clubs to move up to the Bundesliga for the next season. The two promotion spots went to the Regionalliga Berlin and Regionalliga Südwest champions Alemannia Aachen and Borussia Neunkirchen.

Regionalliga Nord									
The 1966–67 season saw two new clubs in the league, HSV Barmbeck-Uhlenhorst and SC Sperber Hamburg, both promoted from the Amateurliga, while no club had been relegated from the Bundesliga to the league.

Regionalliga Berlin									
The 1966–67 season saw three new clubs in the league, Rapide Wedding and Kickers 1900 Berlin, both promoted from the Amateurliga, while Tasmania 1900 Berlin had been relegated from the Bundesliga to the league.

Regionalliga West									
The 1966–67 season saw four new clubs in the league, VfR Neuß, SSV Hagen, Hammer SpVg and Bonner SC, all promoted from the Amateurliga, while no club had been relegated from the Bundesliga to the league.

Regionalliga Südwest									
The 1966–67 season saw three new clubs in the league, FC Homburg and Germania Metternich, both promoted from the Amateurliga, while Borussia Neunkirchen had been relegated from the Bundesliga to the league.

Regionalliga Süd									
The 1966–67 season saw three new clubs in the league, FC 08 Villingen, Germania Wiesbaden and BC Augsburg, all  promoted from the Amateurliga, while no club had been relegated from the Bundesliga to the league.

Bundesliga promotion round

Group 1

Group 2

References

Sources
 30 Jahre Bundesliga  30th anniversary special, publisher: kicker Sportmagazin, published: 1993
 kicker-Almanach 1990  Yearbook of German football, publisher: kicker Sportmagazin, published: 1989, 
 DSFS Liga-Chronik seit 1945  publisher: DSFS, published: 2005

External links
Regionalliga on the official DFB website 
kicker 
Das Deutsche Fussball Archiv  Historic German league tables

1966-67
2
Ger